Murielle Leyssieux (born 21 July 1966) is a French short track speed skater. She competed in the women's 3000 metre relay event at the 1992 Winter Olympics.

References

1966 births
Living people
French female short track speed skaters
Olympic short track speed skaters of France
Short track speed skaters at the 1992 Winter Olympics
Sportspeople from Grenoble
20th-century French women